Cyron DeAndre Brown (born June 28, 1975) is a former American football defensive end.

Early life and college career
Brown played football and basketball at Albert G. Lane Tech High School in Chicago, Illinois, where he earned All-American honors in football and All-City honors in basketball.  He played football at Illinois for three years until transferring to Western Illinois in 1997.

Pro football career
Undrafted in 1998, Brown was a member of the Denver Broncos from 1998 to 2002, primarily as a member of the practice squad.  Brown won a ring as a member of the Broncos Super Bowl XXXIII championship team in 1998.

In 1999, Brown was suspended for four games for violating the league's substance abuse policy.  Brown was the first Bronco to violate the policy. The NFL reinstated Brown on June 10, 2001, and he spent the 2001 season on the practice squad. The Broncos waived Brown on August 26, 2002, prior to the regular season.

Brown played his later football career in the Arena Football League, with the Colorado Crush in 2003, Philadelphia Soul from 2004 to 2006, and Kansas City Brigade in 2007.

References 

1973 births
Living people
Denver Broncos players
Colorado Crush players
Tampa Bay Storm players
Philadelphia Soul players
Kansas City Brigade players
Dallas Desperados players
Western Illinois Leathernecks football players
American football defensive ends
Players of American football from Chicago